Commotion Wireless is an open-source wireless mesh network for electronic communication. The project was developed by the Open Technology Institute, and development included a $2 million grant from the United States Department of State in 2011 for use as a mobile ad hoc network (MANET), concomitant with the Arab Spring. It was preliminarily deployed in Detroit in late 2012, and launched generally in March 2013. The project has been called an "Internet in a Suitcase".

Commotion 1.0, the first non-beta release, was launched on December 30, 2013.

Commotion relies on several open source projects: OLSR, OpenWrt, OpenBTS, and Serval project.

Supported hardware
Ubiquiti:
 PicoStation M2, Release 1 & 1.1, DR2
 Bullet M2/M5,	Release 1 & 1.1, DR2
 NanoStation M2/M5, Release 1 & 1.1, DR2
 Rocket M2/M5, Release 1 & 1.1, DR2
 UniFi AP, Release 1 & 1.1
 UniFi Outdoor, Release 1 & 1.1

TP-Link:
 TL-WDR3600, Release 1.1
 TL-WDR4300, Release 1.1

Mikrotik:
 RB411AH, Release 1.1

See also
 List of router and firewall distributions

References

External links
 

Mesh networking